Baby Sandy (born January 14, 1938), real name Sandra Lea Henville, is a former American child film actress.

Henville was born, prematurely, in hospital in Los Angeles, California. She performed in her first film at the age of 15 months. She was considered "Universal Pictures' wonder baby" and their answer to Shirley Temple. Her last film was before her fifth birthday, made for a second rank studio, Republic Pictures. She grew up and worked in the legal department of a local government. She married and divorced twice, and had two sons.

Work
Her film Bachelor Daddy is based on a similar concept to the much later Three Men and a Baby.

Filmography
 East Side of Heaven (1939) Sandy, the Barrett Baby
 Unexpected Father (1939) Sandy (as Sandy Lee)
 Little Accident (1939) Sandy
 Sandy Is a Lady (1940) Baby Sandy
 Sandy Gets Her Man (1940) Sandy
 Bachelor Daddy (1941) Sandy (as Sandra Lee Henville)
 Melody Lane (1941) Sandy (as Sandy)
 Johnny Doughboy (1942) Baby Sandy
 Life Alert television commercial 2005

References

Bibliography
 Best, Marc. Those Endearing Young Charms: Child Performers of the Screen (South Brunswick and New York: Barnes & Co., 1971), pp. 225–229.

External links 
 

1938 births
American child actresses
Living people
Actresses from Los Angeles
21st-century American women